Milton Keynes Stadium may mean:

 Stadium MK, the home stadium of Milton Keynes Dons F.C. 
 National Hockey Stadium (Milton Keynes), the former home of England Hockey and of Milton Keynes Dons 
 The track and field stadium is in Stantonbury, Milton Keynes
 Milton Keynes Greyhound Stadium, a greyhound racing track in the Ashland district, defunct since 2006